The 2014 season was the New Orleans Saints' 48th in the National Football League, their 39th playing home games at the Mercedes-Benz Superdome and their eighth under head coach Sean Payton.

After they lost to the Atlanta Falcons in Week 16, the Saints were officially eliminated from postseason contention for the first time since 2012.

2014 draft class

Draft trades
 The Saints traded their first- and third-round selections (Nos. 27 and 91 overall, respectively) to the Arizona Cardinals in exchange for the Cardinals' first-round selection (No. 20 overall).
 The Saints acquired an additional fifth-round selection (No. 169 overall) in a trade that sent running back Darren Sproles to the Philadelphia Eagles.
 The Saints traded their seventh-round selection (No. 242 overall) to the San Francisco 49ers in exchange for linebacker Parys Haralson.

Staff

Final roster

Schedule

Preseason

In March 2014, the Saints announced an agreement with The Greenbrier resort to hold the team's training camp at the hotel, in White Sulphur Springs, West Virginia, for three years beginning with 2014.  The hotel has committed to build three football fields and other facilities for the Saints, at an estimated cost of $20–25 million, adjacent to its sports medicine facilities. The project will be partially subsidized by tax breaks recently approved by the state legislature.  The relationship between the hotel and the Saints reportedly grew out of a visit by Saints head coach Sean Payton to the 2013 Greenbrier Classic golf tournament to play in its pro-am competition and then to serve as caddie for his friend, PGA Tour golfer Ryan Palmer.

Regular season

Note: Intra-division opponents are in bold text.

Game summaries

Week 1: at Atlanta Falcons

Week 2: at Cleveland Browns

This was the Browns' first home opener win since 2004, and also marked Johnny Manziel's NFL debut. The defense, primarily by rotating DB's Tashaun Gipson, Buster Skrine, rookie Justin Gilbert and Joe Haden, were able to neutralize TE Jimmy Graham and QB Drew Brees for almost the entire first half. Rookie Terrence West, who had 2500+ all-purpose yards at Division II-school Towson Univ., ran for almost 70 yards and one touchdown. Billy Cundiff hit the game-winning FG as time expired.

Week 3: vs. Minnesota Vikings

After initially stating that Adrian Peterson would return to the active roster for their Week 3 game at New Orleans, the Vikings later placed the running back on the inactive list indefinitely, pending the outcome of the court case against him. Despite coming into the game at 0–2, the Saints started well, scoring two touchdowns on their first two drives, although DE Everson Griffen was able to block the extra point attempt on the second. The Vikings responded to going 13–0 down with two field goals from 25 and 30 yards respectively, but an injury to Matt Cassel meant a debut for rookie QB Teddy Bridgewater.

Week 4: at Dallas Cowboys

Week 5: vs. Tampa Bay Buccaneers

Week 7: at Detroit Lions

Week 8: vs. Green Bay Packers

This would be only the third game in NFL history to not have a single punt. The Saints also beat the Packers for the first time since the 2008 season.

Week 9: at Carolina Panthers

Week 10: vs. San Francisco 49ers

With 5 seconds left in regulation, Drew Brees passed a potential game winning pass to Jimmy Graham until he was flagged with offensive interference, which sent the game into overtime where San Francisco won with a field goal after recovering a fumble by Brees. With the loss, the Saints dropped their record to 4-5.

This would snap an 11-game winning streak for Saints when playing at home.

Week 11: vs. Cincinnati Bengals

Week 12: vs. Baltimore Ravens

Week 13: at Pittsburgh Steelers
The Pittsburgh Steelers was the only team the Saints were able to beat in the AFC North.

Week 14: vs. Carolina Panthers

Week 15: at Chicago Bears

Week 16: vs. Atlanta Falcons

Week 17: at Tampa Bay Buccaneers

Standings

Division

Conference

References

External links
 2014 New Orleans Saints at Pro-Football-Reference.com

New Orleans
New Orleans Saints seasons
New